Heavy Equipment Production Company (HEPCO) is an Iranian corporation that manufactures construction equipment, railroad cars, trucks, forklifts and the industrial machinery of oil, gas, energy, metal and mining industries in Arak, HEPCO is the largest heavy equipment manufacturer in the Middle East. This company has 1,500 employees with an annual production capacity of 4,800 units.

History
HEPCO was established and registered in 1972, with the intention of assembly & production of heavy equipment. In 1975 HEPCO resumed operation in its premises in Arak consistory of 1000,000 square meters of land & 40,000 square meters of production hall in collaboration with licencors; namely : Navistar International, Dynapac, Poclain, Sakai Heavy Industries and Lokomo.

In 1984, HEPCO development project was designed in collaboration with Liebherr & Volvo companies, aiming at fabrication of steel structures of construction equipment.

The project recalled for construction of a 60,000 square meter hall and installation of numbers of modern cutting, welding and milling machines, capable of production 2100 units of equipment, in the first phase. In 1993, HEPCO Engineering & Parts was established, enabling HEPCO to produce more parts and component locally (other that steel structures).

As there was ample capacity in fabrication hall, from 1996 on the Company gradually engaged in fabrication of parts and components for industrial projects, as power stations, oil, gas and petrochemical complexes, portal cranes, etc. The capabilities thus gained, were later consolidated in a new Company in 2002 Energy Equipment Production Co. (Teta), fully owned by HEPCO. Today, HEPCO, together with its subsidiaries, and in collaboration with its world partners is active in production, supply and support of construction, mining and industrial projects.

Today HEPCO has close cooperation with companies Like: Volvo, Komatsu, Liebherr, Hyster, New Holland, XCMG, Ingersoll Rand, Case IH, Case CE, Landini, Siemens, Alstom, Doosan Heavy Industries, Astra, YTO Group, Berco, Carraro and Foton Motor.

Gallery

See also
Automotive industry in Iran
Mining in Iran

References

External links
HEPCO Website  

Manufacturing companies established in 1972
Crane manufacturers
Iranian brands
1972 establishments in Iran
Mining equipment companies
Forklift truck manufacturers
Companies listed on the Tehran Stock Exchange
Industrial machine manufacturers
Truck manufacturers of Iran
Rolling stock manufacturers of Iran
Car manufacturers of Iran
Companies based in Arak
Companies of Iran
Manufacturing companies of Iran
Companies of Iran by year of establishment

Construction equipment manufacturers of Iran